Demetrice is a given name. Notable people with the name include:

Demetrice Martin (born 1973), American football coach
Demetrice Morley (born 1987), American gridiron football player
Demetrice Webb or Dee Webb (born 1984), American football player

See also
Demetric